The Amazing Kreskin (born George Joseph Kresge; January 12, 1935), also known as Kreskin, is an American mentalist who became popular on television in the 1970s. He was inspired to become a mentalist by Lee Falk's comic strip Mandrake the Magician, which features a crime-fighting stage magician. He has always presented himself as an "entertainer," never as a psychic, who operates on the basis of suggestion, not the paranormal or supernatural.

Early life
Kreskin was born in Montclair, New Jersey to Polish and Italian parents.

Career
From 1972 to 1975, Kreskin's television series The Amazing World of Kreskin was broadcast throughout Canada on CTV and distributed in syndication in the United States. It was produced in Ottawa, Ontario at the CJOH-TV studios. An additional set of episodes was produced in 1975 through 1977 at the studios of CFTO-TV in Toronto, billed as The New Kreskin Show. He appeared on The Tonight Show 61 times from 1970 to 1980. In the 1980s and 90s he came to prominence again through several appearances on Late Night with David Letterman and on the Howard Stern Show. In 2009 he became the first guest to make three appearances on Late Night with Jimmy Fallon.

Though Kreskin makes "predictions", he does not claim to have paranormal or clairvoyant powers, and does not like to be considered a "psychic". One of his best known tricks is to find his own check for his current performance. If he does not find it, he does not get paid for that day. He instructs the audience to hide an envelope containing his paycheck, while he is escorted off stage and into seclusion by other members of the audience. He then re-emerges and hunts through the audience, almost always being able to ferret out the correct location.

According to Kreskin, he has failed only ten or eleven times, including his performance at Rockwell's in Pelham, where he needed two attempts and a "rehide" of the check with an additional two attempts at finding the check/note. On April 14, 2018, Kreskin failed to find the hidden check while performing to a sold out crowd in New York's Lion Theater on 42nd St. After about 30 minutes of leading viewers around the small theater trying to find the check, Kreskin settled his search on an area behind the stage, out of view of most of the audience. The check was hidden within the general area. His efforts were in vain however, as perhaps eight to ten minutes later he threw up his hands and declared he had failed at the trick for the 12th time in 30 years.

Kreskin teaches classes for law enforcement groups, which "focuses on psychological methods such as jogging lost memories through relaxation techniques or detecting lies through body language and voice inflections".

The 2008 movie The Great Buck Howard is based on the experiences of writer-director Sean McGinly, who worked briefly as Kreskin's road manager.

On January 31, 2022, it was announced that Kreskin will provide the voice of The Magic Tree in a new animated series called, "The Adventures of Little Billy: In Search of the Magic Tree," based on a book of the same name by Barry J. Farber.

Kreskin is still active as a performer and appears regularly on WPIX in New York City, and annually on both the Fox News Channel and CNN to give his New Year's Day predictions for the coming year.

He has been a resident of Caldwell, New Jersey.

Criticism
In 2002, Kreskin made a prediction that there would be a mass UFO sighting over Las Vegas on June 6 between the hours of 9:45 PM and midnight that would be witnessed by thousands of people. He also said that if there were no sighting, he would donate $50,000 to a charity. Hundreds of people camped out that evening, yet no sighting occurred. On June 8, Kreskin appeared in the opening segment of the Coast to Coast AM radio show, hosted by Art Bell, to explain what had happened.

Bell read Kreskin's press release over the air to the effect that: "The sighting prediction was a total fabrication in order to prove people's susceptibility to suggestion post 9/11". Kreskin claimed he was concerned that a terrorist, with the skills of a mentalist such as himself, could pull a similar stunt involving something much worse. He stated that the predicted sighting was only an "experiment". When asked about the $50,000 donation he previously promoted, Kreskin claimed there was indeed a sighting that night since he said glowing green orbs were supposedly spotted in the sky just before midnight and reported by witnesses after news camera crews had already left the scene.

Because of this one reported sighting, Kreskin said his prediction came true anyway and therefore he did not have to pay the money he previously announced. This statement offended Art Bell, who opined that this was merely a publicity stunt on Kreskin's part, and officially banned Kreskin from his show.

As far back as January 1973, a magazine carried an interview with Kreskin in which he alluded to the possibility of this stunt—and to the dangers of the madness of crowds in general:

Works
Kreskin's ESP Booklet, Milton Bradley (1967)
Kreskin's Krystal Booklet, 3M Company, (1971)
The Amazing World Of Kreskin, Random House (1973)
Kreskin's Mind Power Book, McGraw Hill (1977)
Kreskin's Fun Way To Mind Expansion, Doubleday (1984)
Secrets Of The Amazing Kreskin, Prometheus Books (1991)
The Protection Report by Kreskin, Pamphlet, GF International Group (1992)
Kreskin's Super Secrets, booklet, GF International Group (1993)
How To Be A Fake Kreskin, St. Martin's Press (1996)
The Pendulum & Lifelong Enrichment Response Advertising (2000) 
The Amazing Kreskin's Future With The Stars, Meyerbooks (2001)
Mental Power Is Real, Fitness Factory (2006)
Four-Hour Miracle Direct, Response Advertising (2008)
Kreskin Confidential, Author House (2009)
Conversations with Kreskin by The Amazing Kreskin & Michael McCarty, Team Kreskin Productions, LLC (2012)
In Real Time, Thane & Prime (2015)

References

External links

1935 births
Living people
Mentalists
American magicians
People from Montclair, New Jersey
People from West Caldwell, New Jersey
American people of Polish descent
American people of Italian descent
Seton Hall University alumni